The Overseas Chinese Affairs Office of the State Council (OCAO) is an external name of the United Front Work Department (UFWD) of the Chinese Communist Party (CCP). Prior to 2018, OCAO was an administrative office under the State Council of the People's Republic of China responsible for liaising with and influencing overseas Chinese as part of its united front efforts. Due to the 2018 party and government reform in China, OCAO was merged into the UFWD, with its functions being taken up by the department. Under the arrangement "one institution with two names", UFWD reserves the name "Overseas Chinese Affairs Office of the State Council", generally used when dealing in public statements and dealing with the outside world.

History 
OCAO's forerunner, the Committee of Overseas Chinese Affairs, was established in 1949; He Xiangning, the wife of Liao Zhongkai, served as its first head from October 1949 to April 1959, after which her son Liao Chengzhi took over the position of head until the abolishment of the office in June 1970. Upon the establishment of the Overseas Chinese Affairs Office in 1978, Liao Chengzhi also became its first head. Liao Chengzhi's son Liao Hui also joined the office as vice-director in 1983, and was promoted to director in May 1984.

In 1990, OCAO and China News Service personnel were dispatched to the U.S. to found SinoVision and The China Press to counter negative perceptions of the Chinese government following the 1989 Tiananmen Square protests and massacre. 

OCAO has focused on technology transfer through agreements with professional associations in science and technology fields such as the Silicon Valley Chinese Overseas Business Association (SCOBA). OCAO also oversees the Chinese Overseas Exchange Association (COEA), which sponsored annual "Discovery Trips to China for Eminent Young Overseas Chinese".

In October 2016, the Central Commission for Discipline Inspection reported deficiencies in the CCP's control over OCAO. In March 2018, it was announced that the OCAO and its functions, such as China News Service, would be merged into various internal bureaus of the United Front Work Department as well as the All-China Federation of Returned Overseas Chinese, with the OCAO remaining as an external name of the UFWD. In a 2022 ruling, a Canadian court stated that OCAO "engages in covert and surreptitious intelligence gathering”.

Function 
OCAO is tasked with conducting overseas Chinese (OC) affairs work or qiaowu. According to academic James To:

Administration
As of June 2022, Chen Xu is the current director of OCAO, a position previously held by Pan Yue.

See also 

 State Administration of Foreign Experts Affairs

References

External links

 

State Council of the People's Republic of China
1978 establishments in China
Government agencies established in 1978
Government agencies of China
Overseas Chinese organisations
Chinese diaspora
Organizations associated with the Chinese Communist Party
Diaspora ministries
Chinese intelligence agencies
United front (China)
One institution with multiple names